"Boom-Boom-Boom" is a song by Japanese singer-songwriter Rina Aiuchi. It was released on 20 October 2004 through Giza Studio, as the third single from her fourth studio album Playgirl. The song reached number eleven in Japan and has sold over 22,030 copies nationwide. The song served as the theme song to the Japanese television series, Truth or Doubt and Ongaku Senshi Music Fighter.

Commercial performance
"Boom-Boom-Boom" has sold over 22,030 copies in Japan and managed to peak at number eleven on the Oricon weekly singles chart, becoming her first single not to reach top ten since "Ohh! Paradise Taste!!" in 2000.

Track listing

Charts

Weekly charts

Certification and sales

|-
! scope="row"| Japan (RIAJ)
| 
| 22,030
|-
|}

Release history

References

2004 singles
2004 songs
J-pop songs
Songs written by Aika Ohno
Song recordings produced by Daiko Nagato
Songs written by Rina Aiuchi